The Château de Vaucocour or Vaucocourt is a château in Thiviers, Dordogne, Nouvelle-Aquitaine, France.

References

Châteaux in Dordogne